The Anglican Holy Trinity Church in Norton Malreward, Somerset, England dates from the late 12th century. It has been designated as a Grade II listed building.

The archway between the nave and chancel and the font remain from the original Norman church, however much of the rest of the building has been revised and expanded over the centuries. The  two stage west tower was added in the 15th century with diagonal buttresses to the lower stage and rebuilt, along with much of the church, around 1860 by James Wilson of Bath. It is surmounted by battlements and pinnacles.

The church is within a joint benefice with the Church of St Andrew, Chew Magna and the Church of St Michael, Dundry.

See also
 List of ecclesiastical parishes in the Diocese of Bath and Wells

References

12th-century church buildings in England
Church of England church buildings in Bath and North East Somerset
Grade II listed churches in Somerset
Grade II listed buildings in Bath and North East Somerset